This list of Bowling Green Falcons football players in the NFL Draft.

Key

Selections

References

External links
 Official website

Bowling Green Falcons

Bowling Green Falcons NFL Draft